Luiz Cláudio Menon (born February 7, 1944) is a former Brazilian basketball player. Menon participated at the 1963,  1967 and 1970 FIBA World Championships as well as at the 1968 and 1972 Summer Olympics with the Brazil national basketball team.

References

External links
 

1944 births
Living people
Brazilian men's basketball players
1963 FIBA World Championship players
1967 FIBA World Championship players
1970 FIBA World Championship players
Olympic basketball players of Brazil
Basketball players at the 1968 Summer Olympics
Basketball players at the 1972 Summer Olympics
Pan American Games gold medalists for Brazil
Pan American Games silver medalists for Brazil
Basketball players at the 1963 Pan American Games
Basketball players at the 1971 Pan American Games
Pan American Games medalists in basketball
FIBA World Championship-winning players
Sociedade Esportiva Palmeiras basketball players
Esporte Clube Sírio basketball players
Medalists at the 1971 Pan American Games
Basketball players from São Paulo